The Carmarthenshire Senior Cup is a football knockout tournament involving teams from in Carmarthenshire, West Wales who play in leagues administered and associated with the Carmarthenshire Association Football League.

Competition history

Past winners
Since the league began the following clubs have been senior cup winners.

1920s

 1925–26: 
 1926–27: Llanelly Steel
 1927–28: Dafen Welfare
 1928–29:
 1929–30:

1930s

 1930–31:
 1931–32:  
 1932–33: Bwlch Rangers
 1933–34: Bwlch Rangers
 1934–35: Halfway United
 1935–36: Halfway United
 1936–37: Bwlch Rangers 
 1937–38: Gorsddu Rangers 
 1938–39: Cathan Stars 
 1939–40: No competition

1940s

 1940–41: No competition
 1941–42: No competition
 1942–43: No competition
 1943–44: No competition
 1944–45: No competition
 1945–46: No competition
 1946–47: Dafen Welfare
 1947–48: Hatchers Corries
 1948–49: Bwlch Rangers 
 1949–50: Bwlch Rangers

1950s

 1950–51: Bwlch Rangers 
 1951–52: Ammanford United
 1952–53: Dafen Welfare
 1953–54: Bwlch Rangers 
 1954–55: Babcock & Wilcox
 1955–56: Bwlch Rangers 
 1956–57: Mercury Athletic
 1957–58: Llanelli Steel
 1958–59: Bwlch Rangers 
 1959–60: Ammanford Athletic

1960s

 1960–61: Llanelli A 
 1961–62: Llanelli Steel
 1962–63: Ammanford United 
 1963–64: Pengelli United 
 1964–65: Llanelli A 
 1965–66: Llanelli Steel
 1966–67: Pengelli United 
 1967–68: Llanelli Steel
 1968–69: Gorseinon Athletic
 1969–70: Llanelli Steel

1970s

 1970–71: Llanelli Steel 
 1971–72: Llanelli A
 1972–73: Gorseinon Athletic 
 1973–74: Pengelli United 
 1974–75: Dafen Welfare
 1975–76: Gorseinon Athletic
 1976–77: Dafen Welfare
 1977–78: Garden Suburbs
 1978–79: Bowdens 
 1979–80: Garden Suburbs

1980s

 1980–81: Llanelli Steel 
 1981–82: Dafen Welfare 
 1982–83: Garden Suburbs
 1983–84: Gorseinon Athletic
 1984–85: Gorseinon Athletic
 1985–86: Gorseinon Athletic
 1986–87: Gorseinon Athletic
 1987–88: Llanelli A 
 1988–89: Dafen Welfare 
 1989–90: Garden Village

1990s

 1990–91: Pre Star Sports
 1991–92: Llanelli Steel 
 1992–93: Drefach 
 1993–94: Llanelli Steel 
 1994–95: Garden Village
 1995–96: Garden Village
 1996–97: Garden Village
 1997–98: Camford Sports 
 1998–99: Penllergaer 
 1999–2000: Bwlch Rangers

2000s

 2000–01: Trostre Sports 
 2001–02: Seaside
 2002–03: Llanelli Steel 
 2003–04: Evans & Williams 
 2004–05: Seaside
 2005–06: Trostre Sports 
 2006–07: Trostre Sports 
 2007–08: Bwlch Rangers
 2008–09: Pengelli United
 2009–10: Evans & Williams

2010s

 2010–11: Loughor
 2011–12: Seaside 
 2012–13: Seaside
 2013–14: Pengelli United
 2014–15: Seaside 
 2015–16: Trostre Sports 
 2016–17: Seaside
 2017–18: Gorseinon Athletic
 2018–19: Ammanford reserves
 2019–20: Competition cancelled due to the COVID-19 pandemic

2020s

 2020–21: Competition cancelled due to the COVID-19 pandemic
 2021–22: Trostre

Number of competition wins since 1930s

Bwlch Rangers – 11 
Llanelli Steel – 10 (+1 in the 1920s)
Gorseinon Athletic – 8
Dafen Welfare – 6 (+1 in the 1920s)
Seaside – 6
Pengelli United – 5 
Trostre Sports – 5 
Garden Village – 4 
Llanelli A – 4 
Garden Suburbs – 3 
Ammanford United – 2
Evans & Williams – 2 
Halfway United – 2 
Ammanford reserves – 1 
Ammanford Athletic – 1 
Babcock & Wilcox – 1
Bowdens – 1 
Camford Sports – 1 
Cathan Stars – 1
Drefach – 1 
Gorsddu Rangers – 1 
Hatchers Corries – 1
Loughor Rovers – 1 
Mercury Athletic – 1 
Penllergaer – 1 
Pre Star Sports – 1

See also
Pembrokeshire Senior Cup - a similar competition in neighbouring Pembrokeshire.

Notes and references

External links
Carmarthenshire Association Football League

Football cup competitions in Wales
County Cup competitions
Sport in Carmarthenshire
Football in Wales
Carmarthenshire
Carmarthenshire League